Myles Joseph Jaye (born December 28, 1991) is an American former professional baseball pitcher who played in Major League Baseball (MLB) for the Detroit Tigers in 2017.

Career

Toronto Blue Jays
Jaye attended Starr's Mill High School in Fayetteville, Georgia, and was drafted by the Toronto Blue Jays in the 17th round of the 2010 Major League Baseball Draft.

Chicago White Sox
On January 1, 2012, Jaye, along with Daniel Webb, was traded to the Chicago White Sox for Jason Frasor.

Texas Rangers
In December 2015, he was traded to the Texas Rangers for Will Lamb.

Detroit Tigers
The Rangers then traded him along with Bobby Wilson to the Detroit Tigers for Bryan Holaday in March 2016.

The Tigers added Jaye to their 40-man roster after the 2016 season. On September 2, 2017, Jaye was called up to the Tigers and made his Major League debut. Jaye earned his first major league win in a September 5 game against the Kansas City Royals, pitching  scoreless innings in relief of starter Aníbal Sánchez. He was outrighted to Triple-A on November 2, 2017, and elected free agency on November 6.

Minnesota Twins
Jaye signed a minor league contract with the Minnesota Twins on November 30, 2017.

Cleveland Indians
On May 29th, 2018, the Cleveland Indians acquired Jaye from the Twins in exchange for cash considerations. He elected free agency on November 3, 2018.

References

External links

1991 births
Baseball players from Georgia (U.S. state)
Birmingham Barons players
Bluefield Blue Jays players
Detroit Tigers players
Erie SeaWolves players
Kannapolis Intimidators players
Living people
Major League Baseball pitchers
People from Fayetteville, Georgia
Toledo Mud Hens players
Winston-Salem Dash players
Columbus Clippers players
Rochester Red Wings players
Sportspeople from the Atlanta metropolitan area